KARN (920 kHz) is a commercial AM radio station in Little Rock, Arkansas, owned and operated by Cumulus Media.  It airs a sports radio format known as "920 AM The Sports Animal."  The station's studios are located on Wellington Hills Road in West Little Rock.  The transmitter tower is located off North Hills Boulevard in North Little Rock.  KARN broadcasts at 5,000 watts, using a directional antenna at night to avoid interfering with other stations on AM 920.  KARN is licensed by the Federal Communications Commission to broadcast a digital HD signal.

Most of the day, KARN carries the CBS Sports Radio Network. Middays it carries nationally syndicated sports shows from Dan Patrick and Jim Rome.  KARN is an affiliate of the Dallas Cowboys Radio Network.

History

Early years
KARN is among the oldest stations in Little Rock, getting its original broadcast license on July 6, 1928.  Originally it was KGHI, operating on 890 kilocycles, at 500 watts by day and 250 watts at night.  In 1931, the station changed its call sign to KARK, to identify with Arkansas, becoming a founding member and the flagship station of the Arkansas Radio Network.

By the late 1930s, KARK had increased its power to 1,000 watts full-time, and became an affiliate of the NBC Red Network.  During the Golden Age of Radio, it carried NBC's dramas, comedies, news, sports, game shows, soap operas and big band remote broadcasts.

Move to AM 920
In the early 1940s, the station switched to its current dial position at 920 kHz.  It got a power boost to 5,000 watts.  In an industry advertisement in Broadcasting magazine, it touted its increased signal, saying "No one, other than KARK, covers 43 counties in Arkansas."  It added that Arkansas had more retail sales than Wyoming and Vermont combined.

By the 1950s, as network programming was shifting to television, KARK moved to a middle of the road format, with news and sports broadcasts.  On April 15, 1954, KARK-TV signed on, the second TV station in Little Rock.  (Channel 7 KATV had gone on the air seven months earlier.)  Since KARK was an NBC Radio affiliate, KARK-TV began broadcasting NBC-TV programming, and has since its sign-on.  On June 22, 1961, 103.7 KARK-FM began broadcasting, simulcasting 920 KARK.

In 1972, Channel 4 was sold to a Denver-based company.  The TV station kept the KARK-TV call sign but that required the radio stations, now owned by Ted Snider, to switch to new call letters.  They became KARN and KARN-FM.  By this point KARN-FM had stopped simulcasting, instead becoming a Top 40 outlet, later taking the call letters KKYK (now KABZ).

Switch to talk radio
By the early 1980s, KARN had discontinued music programming.  It became an affiliate of CBS Radio News and switched to a news/talk format, picking up nationally syndicated shows such as Rush Limbaugh and Sean Hannity.  Generations of Arkansas broadcasters have worked at KARN, including sportscaster Jim Elder, talk show hosts Dave Elswick , Pat Lynch, Ray Lincoln, Bob Harrison, Taylor Carr and Sharon Lee, farm broadcasters Gary DiGiuseppe, Bob Buice, Lowell Ruffcorn, John Philpot, Stewart Doan, Janet Adkison and Keith Merckx and newscasters Bob Steel, Don Corbett, Vern Beachy, Scott Crowder, Michael Hibblen, Scott Charton, Rita Richardson, Ron Breeding, Don Griffin, Barry Green, David Wallace, Ken Miller, Paula Cooper, Terry Easley, Jayson Rogers, Grant Merrill, Alan Caudle, Patrick Grant, Ed Johnson, Jeff Herzer and Jack Heinritz.  KARN's Program Directors have included Rick McGee, Dennis Turner, Chuck Martin, Dennis Kelly, Dale Forbis, Bob Shomper, Greg Foster, Neal Gladner, Bud Ford and Dave Elswick.

FM simulcasts
In 1997, Citadel Broadcasting, a forerunner of Cumulus Media, bought KARN and several other Little Rock stations.  Citadel wanted to aggressively market KARN's talk format.  For a number of years, KARN simulcast on two suburban FM signals, 3,000 watt 102.5 FM licensed to Cabot (now KPZK-FM), and 6,000 watt 101.7 FM licensed to Humnoke (now KVLO).  While both stations added to KARN's ratings, neither signal covers the Little Rock radio market well. In the summer of 2004, the decision was made to simulcast KARN full-time on the co-owned 50,000 watt 102.9 FM frequency, licensed to Sheridan, which became KARN-FM.  Now KARN listeners could continue to hear the station on AM 920 or switch to the better sound quality of FM on 102.9.

In 2007, when Citadel acquired nearly two dozen ABC Radio stations, the company relinquished 11 of its radio stations, including KARN-FM, to The Last Bastion Station Trust, LLC.  At first, the trust decided it would not simulcast KARN, which had remained with Citadel, on KARN-FM.  But later, Citadel transferred urban adult contemporary 102.1 KOKY to the trust, while re-acquiring KARN-FM.  Citadel merged with Cumulus Media on September 16, 2011.

The Sports Animal

In 2009, Citadel Broadcasting decided to end the simulcast.  KARN became "920 AM The Sports Animal" airing local shows and national programming from Fox Sports Radio.  102.9 KARN-FM continues as a talk station.  Cumulus Media owns an interest in the CBS Sports Radio Network.  So in 2013, when CBS Sports Radio became a 24/7 network, KARN switched its network affiliation, dropping Fox Sports for CBS Sports.

References

External links
KARN official website

FCC History Cards for KARN

ARN
Cumulus Media radio stations
Sports radio stations in the United States
Radio stations established in 1928
1928 establishments in Arkansas
CBS Sports Radio stations